Bound for Glory is a reality television show which aired on ESPN from October to December 2005. The show featured former Chicago Bears linebacker Dick Butkus coaching the suburban Pittsburgh (Robinson based) Montour High School Spartans. The Spartans were a perennial Pennsylvania state champion contender in the 1950s and 1960s but had consistent losing records since. Butkus coached the team to a 1–6 record before leaving the team, claiming he had fulfilled his contract for the show. He was highly critical of the players, and chided them on the show for their poor attitude.

References

American football television series
2000s American reality television series
2005 American television series debuts
2005 American television series endings
ESPN original programming
American sports television series
Television shows set in Pittsburgh